Arhaan is a name. Notable people with this name include:
Arhaan Behll (born 1984), Indian actor
Arhaan Khan, Indian model and film and TV actor
Srinda Arhaan, Indian film actress

Indian masculine given names